The Juvenals (Swedish: Juvenalerna) was a student society at the University of Uppsala, in Sweden.  It was founded in 1835 and dedicated to music and merrymaking.  In 1843, Gunnar Wennerberg became a member, and quickly assumed leadership. His series of compositions entitled Gluntarne was written for the society.  He also composed De Tre, or "The Three", for three singers in the society. In 1849, when Wennerberg moved from Uppsala, the society quickly declined and soon disappeared. It was resurrected in 1907, as The Juvenal Order.

Student organizations in Sweden
Defunct clubs and societies
Uppsala University
Student organizations established in 1835
1835 establishments in Sweden